Melodisc Records was a record label founded by Emil E. Shalit in the late 1940s. It was one of the first independent record labels in the UK and the parent company of the Blue Beat label.

History
Melodisc records was founded by Austrian-born American citizen Emil Edward Shalit (24 December 1909 – 23 April 1983) and his business partner Jack Chilkes. Melodisc began trading in London, England, in August 1949 and soon became established as one of the first—and, at the time, the largest—independent record labels in the UK. Its offices were in Earlham Street, Covent Garden.

The company was founded in 1949 when Shalit was still living in New York City, with the initial purpose of licensing American jazz for release in the UK. In London, Melodisc was managed by Jack Chilkes until a disagreement with Shalit led to his departure and a subsequent lawsuit in late 1952;  According to Chilkes, Shalit had tricked him into believing that he owned the rights to material actually owned by other companies.  In the early 1950s, Melodisc focused on licensing and releasing American jazz and folk records in the UK and had a production and distribution arrangement with Decca Records.  After Chilkes was replaced by Trinidadian Rupert Nurse, who became Melodisc's musical director, the label also released rhythm and blues, West Indian, and African recordings. Calypso and mento music was also released to cater to the growing Afro-Caribbean community in Britain.  Early Melodisc releases in the UK included 78 rpm and later 45 rpm records, EPs, and LPs by artists such as Big Bill Broonzy, Louis Jordan, Josh White, Woody Guthrie, Lead Belly, and Charlie Parker.

From the early 1950s, Melodisc started recording musicians in London, particularly at the Esquire studios in Bedford Court Mansions in Covent Garden. Early recordings were supervised by Denis Preston. Among the musicians recorded were Jamaican-born jazz musician Joe Harriott, pianist Russ Henderson, and the Trinidadians Lord Beginner and Lord Kitchener, whose song "Birth of Ghana" was recorded in London in late 1956. Melodisc was actively involved in exporting records from Britain to the emerging record-buying markets in West Africa and the Caribbean including Guyanese singer Terry Nelson (aka Halla Gala).

From the mid- to late 1950s, Melodisc sought out Jamaican-produced records to distribute in Britain and made deals with producers such as Coxsone Dodd and Duke Reid.  It released Laurel Aitken's "Lonesome Lover" in the UK in 1960.  Following its success, Shalit employed Sigimund "Siggy" Jackson to set up a subsidiary label, Blue Beat, which focused on Jamaican blues and ska music.  For several years, the label name became synonymous with Jamaican music in the UK and became associated with the mod and later skinhead sub-cultures of the 1960s and early 1970s.

In 1966, Melodisc set up a new sub-label, Fab Records, to release rocksteady music. The Melodisc label continued to release LPs through the 1960s and into the early 1970s. Artists included Prince Buster, Ambrose Campbell, Ginger Johnson, Ravi Shankar, and Lord Kitchener.

Emil Shalit died in Slough, England, in 1983, at the age of 73.

Discography

Singles

Produced for Butlins Holiday Camps, Jazz Series, and Others

Melodisc Presents New Jazz

EPs

LPs

10"

12"

References

External links
 African Music on 45 rpm records in the UK, 1954-1981, including section on Melodisc

British independent record labels
Record labels established in 1949